DSMC is an abbreviation for any of the following:

 Daniel Stewart's And Melville College, a private school in Edinburgh, Scotland
 Defense Systems Management College, a military acquisition training institution - part of the Defense Acquisition University
 Direct simulation Monte Carlo
 Distributed Storage Manager Client, the host based client portion of IBM Tivoli Storage Manager
 Digital Still and Motion Camera, a camera system by Red Digital Cinema Camera Company
 D.S. Senanayake College Media circle, see List of clubs and associations in DSSC
 Department of Sacred Music and Communications, a music organization of the Mar Thoma Syrian Church in Thiruvalla, Kerala India